The greenish elaenia (Myiopagis viridicata) is a species of bird in the family Tyrannidae, the tyrant flycatchers.
It is found in Argentina, Belize, Bolivia, Brazil, Colombia, Costa Rica, Ecuador, El Salvador, Guatemala, Guyana, Honduras, Mexico, Nicaragua, Panama, Paraguay, Peru, the United States, and Venezuela.
Its natural habitats are subtropical or tropical dry forests, subtropical or tropical moist lowland forests, and heavily degraded former forest.

References

External links
Greenish elaenia videos on the Internet Bird Collection
Greenish elaenia photo gallery VIREO Photo-High Res
Photo; Article www.texasbirds.org

Myiopagis
Birds of Mexico
Birds of the Sierra Madre Oriental
Birds of the Sierra Madre del Sur
Birds of the Trans-Mexican Volcanic Belt
Birds of the Yucatán Peninsula
Birds of Central America
Birds of South America
Birds of the Cerrado
Birds of the Pantanal
Birds of the Caatinga
Birds described in 1817
Taxa named by Louis Jean Pierre Vieillot
Taxonomy articles created by Polbot